The lowland copperhead or lowlands copperhead (Austrelaps superbus) is a venomous  snake species in the family Elapidae, found in southeastern Australia and Tasmania. It is commonly referred to as the copperhead, but is not closely related to the American copperhead, Agkistrodon contortrix.  If provoked, the lowland copperhead is a dangerous snake with neurotoxic venom, which can kill an adult human if correct first aid is not applied promptly.

Description
The lowland copperhead is generally 1-1.5 m (3–5 feet) long. Their colour varies a great deal, from a coppery mid-brown to yellowish, reddish, grey or  black. The copper head colouring that gave rise to the common name is not always present. Its venom has been measured at 0.5 mg/kg subcutaneous.

Distribution and habitat
It is found in southeastern Australia, including Tasmania. A. superbus has a preference for areas of low vegetation near water bodies where it hunts for frogs, lizards and snakes, including smaller specimens of its own species. It has been found in sandstone ridgetop woodland in the Blue Mountains, west of Sydney, where it is becoming rare, due to increasing fires and the spread of urban settlements.

Venom
The venom of lowland copperhead contains postsynaptic neurotoxins. There have been a dozen reported bites from this species, with one fatality.

References

Austrelaps
Reptiles of Tasmania
Reptiles described in 1858
Taxa named by Albert Günther
Reptiles of Victoria (Australia)
Snakes of Australia
Reptiles of New South Wales